Capnoides sempervirens, the harlequin corydalis, rock harlequin, pale corydalis or pink corydalis, is an annual or biennial plant native to rocky woodland and burned or disturbed places in northern North America. Capnoides sempervirens is the only species in the genus Capnoides.

 Name(s) brought to synonymy
 Capnoides elegans Kuntze, a synonym for Corydalis elegans

Description
Both stems and leaves are glaucous.

Flowers bloom from May to September. Often growing out of areas disturbed by fire. Native from Newfoundland to Alaska and south into the eastern United States.

Gallery

External links

Flora of North America — map
Connecticut Botanical Society

References

Fumarioideae
Flora of Connecticut
Monotypic Papaveraceae genera
Taxa named by Moritz Balthasar Borkhausen